Margaret Biggs (born 9 July 1929, Orpington, Kent) is a popular and collectible exponent of the girls' School story. She is best known for her Melling School series of books, first published by Blackie in the 1950s. The series is set at a weekly boarding school and is unusual in that it shows boarding school life and home life side by side. The interaction between girls and boys is also atypical of the genre at that time. The Melling series was republished by Girls Gone By Publishers in the 2000s and the reprints, whilst retaining the original text and artwork, have new introductions by Margaret Biggs, who is ‘taking great pleasure in the republication of her books’. Ms Biggs has also written two new volumes in the series, Kate at Melling, set twelve years after the earlier books, and Changes at Melling, which were published by Girls Gone By Publishers in 2008 and 2009 respectively.

Biography
Margaret Biggs moved to Hertfordshire in 1935 where she was educated at Queen Elizabeth's School for Girls in Barnet. After leaving school in 1946, Biggs obtained employment in the editorial department of Evans Brothers publishers where she met Jacqueline Blairman   with whom she co-wrote her first school story. Prior to that her published writing had consisted of short stories and magazine articles.

Margaret Biggs married David Cadney in 1953. They have three children.

Works

Melling series

The Blakes Come to Melling, Blackie, 1951. ISBN B0000CI0SM
 Republ. by Girls Gone By Publishers, 2004. 
The New Prefect at Melling, Blackie, 1952. ISBN B0000CI7ZY
Republ. by Girls Gone By Publishers, 2004. 
Last Term for Helen, Blackie, 1953. ISBN B0000CIKD0
Republ. by Girls Gone By Publishers, 2005. 
The Head Girl at Melling, Blackie, 1954. ISBN B0000CIT5P
Republ. by Girls Gone By Publishers, 2005. 
Susan in the Sixth, Blackie, 1955. ISBN B0000CJ83R
Republ. by Girls Gone By Publishers, 2007. 
The New Girl at Melling, Blackie, 1956.
Republ. by Girls Gone By Publishers, 2006. 
Summer term at Melling, Blackie, 1957. ISBN B0000CJRRL
Republ. by Girls Gone By Publishers, 2007. 
Stories of Melling School, Blackie, 1960.  (Containing: The Blakes come to Melling, The New Prefect at Melling, and, Last Term for Helen)
More stories of Melling School, Blackie, 1961. ISBN B0000CKXIN (Containing: The Head Girl at Melling, Susan in the Sixth, and, Summer Term at Melling)
Kate at Melling, Girls Gone By Publishers, 2008. 
Changes at Melling, Girls Gone By Publishers, 2009. 

Other titles
Triplets at Royders (with Jacqueline Blairman), Sampson Low, 1950?
Christmas term at Vernley, Blackie, 1951
Republ. by Girls Gone By Publishers, 2012. 
Bobby at Hill House, Warne, 1954
Republ. by Girls Gone By Publishers, 2014. 
Dilly goes to Ambergate, Blackie, 1955
Republ. by Girls Gone By Publishers, 2011. 
The Two Families, Blackie, 1958
Republ. by Girls Gone By Publishers, 2010. 

Short stories
"Mary's New Friend" in A Book of Girls' Stories, Golden Pleasure Books, 1964
Lucinda's Long Afternoon and Pip and the Famous Author in Girls' Choice: A New Book of Stories, Hamlyn, 1965

References 

Sue Sims and Hilary Clare, The Encyclopaedia of Girls' School Stories, Ashgate, 2000

See also

 The Chalet School series of books written by Elinor Brent-Dyer.
 The genre author Angela Brazil

1929 births
Living people
English children's writers
People educated at Queen Elizabeth's School for Girls
20th-century English novelists
21st-century British novelists
20th-century English women writers
21st-century English women writers
English women novelists